Dennis Lee DeBarr (born January 16, 1953) is an American former professional baseball pitcher for the Toronto Blue Jays of Major League Baseball.

Originally drafted by the Detroit Tigers in the 1971 amateur draft, DeBarr was selected by the Toronto Blue Jays in the 1976 MLB expansion draft. He was traded from the Blue Jays to the Cleveland Indians for Rico Carty on March 15, 1978.

References

External links
, or Retrosheet, or Pelota Binaria (Venezuelan Winter League)

1953 births
Living people
American expatriate baseball players in Canada
Baseball players from Wyoming
Bristol Tigers players
Cardenales de Lara players
American expatriate baseball players in Venezuela
Chattanooga Lookouts players
Evansville Triplets players
Lakeland Tigers players
Major League Baseball pitchers
Montgomery Rebels players
Sportspeople from Cheyenne, Wyoming
Toledo Mud Hens players
Toronto Blue Jays players
Waterbury A's players
Wichita Aeros players